Khovanskoye Cemetery, also known as Nikolo-Khovanskoye Cemetery (Николо-Хованское кладбище), is a large and expanding cemetery servicing Moscow, Russia. It is located in the Leninsky District, Moscow Oblast,  beyond the Moscow Ring Road, at the 21st kilometre mark of the Kiev Highway by the Mosrentgen and Nikolo-Khovanskoye settlements.

A Russian Orthodox chapel, which has been visited by Patriarch Alexius II, is located on the cemetery's grounds. A crematorium was built in 1988 for those wishing to use this service.

On 14 May 2016 three Tajik migrant workers died in the cemetery during a fight between hundreds of young mostly North Caucasus toughs and a group of mostly Tajik migrants who maintained the graves. According to Russian prosecutors this fight was the result of the efforts of former Moscow police officer Nikita Moshenko and Yury Chabuyev of the Moscow city-owned burial service Ritual to take control of the maintaining graves business (on the cemetery) worth 20 million rubles ($341,000) a month.

Notable interred
 Vasily Aleksanyan
 Iskra Babich
 Dmitri Bystrolyotov
 Boris Delaunay
 Alexei Khomich
 Viktor Kosykh
 Ivan Safronov
 Ruslana Korshunova

References

External links
 

Cemeteries in Moscow Oblast
Christianity in Moscow
Eastern Orthodox cemeteries
Novomoskovsky Administrative Okrug
1972 establishments in the Soviet Union